Talat Nang Loeng or Talad Nang Loeng (lit: Nang Loeng market; also known as "Nang Loeng") is a market and historic neighbourhood in Bangkok. Located in Wat Sommanat sub-district, Pom Prap Sattru Phai district.

Talat Nang Loeng was built in the reign of King Rama V. His Majesty the King officially opened on March 29, 1900 as the first land market of Thailand.

The name Nang Loeng comes from I Loeng (อีเลิ้ง), its one type of jar of the Mon people, this has been boat trading in the past around this area (Khlong Phadung Krung Kasem). Until the era of Field Marshal Plaek Phibunsongkhram was Prime Minister, so it was changed to Nang Loeng to this day.

Today, around the Talat Nang Loeng is full of old shophouses built with beautiful colonial architecture. And in the market is also a traditional community, which have lived since the market launch. Notable for its food especially Thai desserts. And there's also old cinema (Sala Chaloem Thani; ศาลาเฉลิมธานี), the current closed down in 1993, which has now become a warehouse.

Nearby places
Government House
Royal Dusit Golf Club
Thewakam Rangrak Bridge
Wat Somanat Wihan

References

External links

Neighbourhoods of Bangkok
Pom Prap Sattru Phai district
Retail markets in Bangkok
1900 establishments in Siam